The Union Sportsmen's Alliance (USA) is a union-operated, union-dedicated, conservation organization.  It is committed to uniting the more than six million active and retired AFL-CIO trade union members who hunt, fish, shoot and recreate outdoors into one community with a shared commitment to educate future generations of sportsmen and sportswomen, conserve healthy wildlife habitat and volunteer their time and skills for projects that improve outdoor access for all.

The Union Sportsmen's Alliance goal is to become North America's largest community of Union sportsmen and women committed to preserving our outdoor heritage for generations to come.

The USA is non-partisan and does not take positions on or endorse political agendas, parties or candidates. This statement does not reflect, in any way, on how the USA's participating unions communicate with their members on political, legislative or policy issues.

History
In 2007 the Theodore Roosevelt Conservation Partnership and Union leaders saw a unique opportunity to form a union-dedicated conservation based organization—the Union Sportsmen's Alliance. It was founded on January 15, 2007, at the SHOT (Shooting, Hunting, and Outdoor Trades) Show in Orlando, FL.

In May 2010, just three years after its creation, the Union Sportsmen's Alliance grew strong enough to become a stand-alone hunting, fishing and conservation organization with more than 20,000 members from across the U.S. and Canada. In the fall of 2013, the Union Sportsmen's Alliance achieved a new milestone by surpassing 100,000 members.

See also

 Theodore Roosevelt Conservation Partnership

References

External links

 
 Brotherhood Outdoors, the official show of the Union Sportsmen's Alliance

Nature conservation organizations based in the United States
Environmental organizations based in Tennessee
Hunting in the United States
Wetlands organizations
Wetland conservation in the United States
Environmental organizations established in 2007
2007 establishments in the United States